Wild Blood is a 1928 American silent Western film directed by Henry MacRae and starring Jack Perrin, Ethlyne Clair and Theodore Lorch.

Cast
 Rex as Rex, Mary's Horse 
 Jack Perrin as Jack Crosby
 Ethlyne Clair as Mary Ellis
 Theodore Lorch as Luke Conner
 Nelson McDowell as John Ellis

References

Bibliography
 Rainey, Buck. Sweethearts of the Sage: Biographies and Filmographies of 258 actresses appearing in Western movies. McFarland & Company, 1992.

External links
 

1928 films
1928 Western (genre) films
1920s English-language films
American black-and-white films
Universal Pictures films
Films directed by Henry MacRae
Silent American Western (genre) films
1920s American films